Marcel Marcus "Red" Chesbro (August 22, 1914 – April 11, 1970) was an American football player.  A native of New York, Chesbro attended Colgate University.  He played college football for the Colgate Red Raiders football team and was selected by Liberty magazine  as a first-team tackle on the 1936 College Football All-America Team.  He also played professional football as a guard for the Cleveland Rams during the 1938 NFL season.  He later became an executive with Eastner Rock Products Co. of Oriskany Falls, New York.

References

1914 births
1970 deaths
American football guards
American football tackles
Cleveland Rams players
Colgate Raiders football players
People from Madison County, New York
Players of American football from New York (state)